Chattanooga is an unincorporated community located in Mercer County, Ohio.

Demographics

Chattanooga has a population of 418, with  approximately 49.51% males and 50.49% females.

History
A post office called Chattanooga was established in 1882, and remained in operation until 1905. Chattanooga is derived from the Cherokee name for "crow's nest". In 1907, Chattanooga had 100 inhabitants.

References

Unincorporated communities in Mercer County, Ohio
Unincorporated communities in Ohio